Sue Hastings (May 10, 1884 – 1977) was an American puppeteer known for popularizing the ancient art of puppetry in the 1930s and 1940s. She was a protégé of famous advertising artist and master puppeteer Tony Sarg. She was known as a society hostess and for performing with her large collection of professionally made marionettes, which she created with the assistance of her large team of artisan puppeteers. Her many renowned performing companies were headquartered in New York City, New York, USA. During the height of her career, as owner and CEO of Sue Hastings Marionettes, Inc., she reputedly, in her inimitable "hands-on" style, was actively and very successfully directing over 50 performing companies, some of which performed worldwide for heads of Royalty, such as Queen Elizabeth I, and many other dignitaries and distinguished national and international diplomats and world leaders.

Sometime during the 1940s or 1950s, former Sue Hastings puppeteers Harold "Hal" and Linnea Linsley purchased a portion of the huge collection and eventually moved them to the Dallas/Fort Worth, Texas area. This gigantic collection consisted of well over 1,000 marionettes, some of which had been professionally constructed as early as the late 1920s to early 1930s, ranging in size from five to ten inches to well over two to three feet in height.

Included were puppet caricatures of many famous personalities of radio, stage, films and television. I've actually had the thrill of touching several of these celebrity marionettes. Included in the few I personally saw were marionette caricatures of such stars as actors/comedians Oliver Hardy and Stan Laurel, actress/dancer/singer Carmen Miranda and comedian/actor Jimmy Durante and many others.

Linnea, an inveterate stage performer, had been one of the many dancing and singing chorus girls performing as an integral part of Florenz Ziegfeld's "Ziegfeld's Follies" of the 1920s and was, as they say in show business, a " real trouper". Even after husband Hal's death sometime during the 1960s, she carried on performing alone with her Hastings marionettes and other puppets. She was seen performing on television with her "Tapper Rabbit" marionette during the 1960s from a Fort Worth, Texas station and later in the 1970s from a Dallas, Texas television station portraying a grandmotherly storyteller with several fascinated children gathered around her rocking chair as she told them the story of "Town East Mall" as an advertisement for the then newly-opened shopping mall in nearby Mesquite, Texas. Linnea continued to perform with her beloved puppets until some years later, during the 1970s, when her declining health prevented her continuing. She did, however, continue to teach her puppetry art to a select few interested students from her Oak Cliff neighborhood home in Dallas, Texas for a few years.

Linnea somehow met Kathy Burks, a Dallas Symphony Orchestra cellist, and mother of two teenagers who were very involved with the Dallas Junior League which is a group for performing arts interested children and teens. Kathy's teens, Douglass and Becky, showed great interest in puppetry and Kathy eventually purchased the Sue Hastings Marionettes collection from Linnea sometime during the middle 1970s.  Linnea spent many hours tirelessly teaching Kathy and her children the wonderful art of the puppet, especially concentrating on construction, performance and maintenance of the quickly aging Hastings marionette collection.

Kathy, with the tremendous help of her family and many friends formed Kathy Burks Marionettes company. I met Kathy Burks in 1975 or 1976  backstage after one of her company's performances for the Dr. Pepper Circus at the Fair of Texas. This meeting with this warm and welcoming woman was to be my introduction to the exciting world of professional puppetry. I subsequently learned she had been storing the Sue Hastings Marionettes collection in a warehouse on Ladybird Lane in Dallas,Texas, and that Linnea Linsley planned to present a puppetry workshop there that summer. I attended that workshop and will never forget the careful, warm and friendly manner with which Linnea, "Mrs. Linsley", handled each of the participants, giving them much appreciated consistent praise and admonition throughout the training. I will always respect and admire this woman of tremendous skill and experience and I will be forever grateful for her guidance, interest and influence in my development both as a puppeteer and a person. I will also always be grateful to Kathy Burks for our introduction.

The Kathy Burks Marionettes have since become the Kathy Burks Theatre of Puppetry Arts and continues to perform at the Dallas Children's Theater and other venues in the Dallas, Texas area.

The company has continued Linnea's tradition of using the collection for performances for many years, but sadly, many of the practically antique puppets were just too fragile to continue using and were retired, only being used for exhibitions now and then. , Kathy's two now-grown children, Douglass and Becky, along with many dedicated friends and employees, are still actively operating the company.

For further information: The Kathy Burks Theatre of Puppetry Arts has a website and a Facebook page. The Dallas  Children's Theater also has their website. (Please see below)

External links
 Facebook page for Kathy Burks Theatre of Puppetry Arts
 Dallas Children's Theater blog: "Celebrating 45 Years of Kathy Burks Theatre of Puppetry Arts"
 Dallas Children's Theater videos:
 "The Nutcracker- Kathy Burks Theatre of Puppetry Arts"
 "Kathy Burks Theatre of Puppetry Arts- Puppet Shows Dallas Texas"
 "Behind the Scenes- The Nutcracker- Kathy Burks Theatre of Puppetry Arts" - This video shows Douglass Burks as he explains and demonstrates for a girl)
 "Celebrating 45 Years of Kathy Burks Theatre of Puppetry Arts"
 "The Nutcracker- Kathy Burks Theatre of Puppetry Arts"
 "Kathy Burks Theatre of Puppetry Arts- Carnival of the Animals"
 The Dallas Observer (newspaper): 6456180 "Kathy Burks Theatre of Puppetry Arts"
 Art and Seek: "Kathy Burks Theatre of Puppetry Arts- Dallas Children's Theater
 Guide Live -Things to Do: "Kathy Burks Theatre of Puppetry Arts- The Nutcracker..."
 Culture Map Dallas:
 Theater Jones - North Texas Performing Arts News: "Kathy Burks Theatre of Puppetry Arts Takes us on a Fantastic Journey with Hansel and Gretel"
 Arts and Culture Texas - Dallas Theatre Center - "The Puppet Lady"
 D Magazine - "Pulling Strings"
 University of Iowa Library - "Sue Hastings Marionettes: the largest and most active marionette organization in the country"

1884 births
1977 deaths
Puppet designers